The Laurence Olivier Award for Best Comedy Performance was an annual award presented by the Society of London Theatre in recognition of achievements in commercial London theatre. The awards were established as the Society of West End Theatre Awards in 1976, and renamed in 1984 in honour of English actor and director Laurence Olivier.

This commingled actor/actress award was introduced in 1976, and was last presented at the 1995 ceremony, after which it was retired. On the 19 occasions that this award was given, it was presented three times to an actress and 16 times to an actor.

Winners and nominees

1970s

1980s

1990s

References

External links
 

Comedy